Schizochilus is a genus of flowering plants from the orchid family, Orchidaceae. It is native to southern and eastern Africa.

Species accepted as of June 2014:

Schizochilus angustifolius Rolfe in W.H.Harvey & auct. suc.  - South Africa
Schizochilus bulbinella (Rchb.f.) Bolus  - South Africa, Lesotho
Schizochilus calcaratus P.J.Cribb & la Croix - Zimbabwe 
Schizochilus cecilii Rolfe - South Africa, Zimbabwe, Eswatini
Schizochilus crenulatus H.P.Linder - Mpumalanga
Schizochilus flexuosus Harv. ex Rolfe in W.H.Harvey & auct. suc. - South Africa, Lesotho
Schizochilus gerrardii (Rchb.f.) Bolus - KwaZulu-Natal
Schizochilus lepidus Summerh. - Zimbabwe, Mozambique
Schizochilus lilacinus Schelpe ex H.P.Linder - Mpumalanga
Schizochilus sulphureus Schltr. - Mozambique, Malawi, Tanzania
Schizochilus zeyheri Sond.  - South Africa, Eswatini

See also 
 List of Orchidaceae genera

References

External links 

Orchideae
Orchideae genera
Orchids of Africa
Taxa named by Otto Wilhelm Sonder